Harrop may refer to:

Surname
Brett Harrop (born 1979), Australian cricketer
Bobby Harrop (1936–2007), English footballer
Douglas Harrop (born 1947), English cricketer
Froma Harrop (born 1950), American journalist and author
George A. Harrop (1890–1945), American physician, nutritionist and writer
J. Harrop (fl. 1874), English cricketer
Jimmy Harrop (1884–1954), English footballer
John James Harrop (1910–1988), accountant and political figure in Saskatchewan
Joseph Harrop (1867-1936), English mill owner and local politician
Josh Harrop (born 1995), English footballer
Kerys Harrop (born 1990), English footballer
Les Harrop (born 1948), English and Australian writer, editor, and teacher
Loretta Harrop (born 1975), Australian triathlete
Max Harrop (born 1993), English footballer
Roger Harrop, English business consultant, public speaker and author
Trevor Harrop (born 1927), British swimmer
William Hulton-Harrop (1906–1979), British Army officer
William Harrop (RAF officer), British World War I flying ace
William C. Harrop (born 1929), American diplomat

Other
Harrop formula, formula in intuitionistic logic
Dyson–Harrop satellite, hypothetical megastructure intended for power generation, using the solar wind
Harrop Island, small island off Enderby Land, Antarctica

Harrop, a community in British Columbia, Canada